A  is a clustered human settlement or community of Banjaras. It is equal to a hamlet but smaller than a village, with a population of a few hundred. They are often located in rural areas (tribal areas) with jubdas (huts) as shelter.

In the 1990s  were normally temporary places of living because the Bajaras were transient. However, the people are now settling permanently and have fixed dwellings.

Notes

Types of administrative division
Rural geography
Urban geography
Types of populated places
Settlement geography